Gennadiy Martovich Prashkevich (born May 16, 1941 in Pirovskoye, Krasnoyarsk Krai) is a Russian science fiction writer, critic, editor, translator and International PEN member. He won the Aelita Prize (1994) and Garin-Mikhaylovsky Prize (1999). He is also a poet, translator and essayist. Some of his works (Razorvanoye chudo (The Torn Miracle, 1978), Pyat kostrov rombom (Five Bonfires In A Rhomb, 1989), Shpion protiv alkhimikov (A Spy Versus Alchemists, 1994), Shkatulka rytsarya (The Knight's Casket, 1996) became popular.

Prashkevich graduated from Tomsk University and participated in various geological and paleontological expeditions to Ural, Kuzbass, Yakutia, Far East and Kamchatka. As a science fiction writer Prashkevich debuted with the story Ostrov Tumanov (The Island of Mists) in 1957, having close ties with Ivan Yefremov by that time. His verse books include Posvyashcheniya (The Dedications, 1992) and Spor s dyavolom (A Dispute With Devil, 1996). Prashkevich's works were published in the United States, Great Britain, Germany, Poland, Bulgaria and in some other countries.

References
Lib.Aldebaran.ru
Fandom.rusf.ru

1941 births
Living people
People from Yeniseysky District
Russian science fiction writers
Russian speculative fiction translators
Russian male essayists
Russian speculative fiction critics
Soviet science fiction writers
Soviet male writers
20th-century Russian male writers
Tomsk State University alumni
20th-century Russian translators
20th-century essayists